Mark of the Unicorn (MOTU) is a music-related computer software and hardware supplier. It is based in Cambridge, Massachusetts and has created music software since 1984. In the mid-1980s, Mark of the Unicorn sold productivity software and several games for the Macintosh, Atari ST, and Amiga.

Products

Current
Digital Performer
AudioDesk

Past
 MINCE and SCRIBBLE, an Emacs-like editor and Scribe-like text formatter for CP/M machines. MINCE was also available for the Atari ST.
 FinalWord word processor (sold and became Sprint).
 Professional Composer, one of the first graphical music-notation editors.
 Mouse Stampede, arguably the first arcade-style game available for the Apple Macintosh (1984).
 Hex game for the Atari ST and Amiga computers (released in 1985).
 The first FireWire Audio Interface for Mac and Windows.
 PC/Intercomm, VT100 emulator for the Atari ST.

References

External links 
 

Computer companies of the United States
Companies based in Cambridge, Massachusetts